Prince Imperial is the title created after the proclamation of independence of the Empire of Brazil, in 1822, to designate the heir apparent or the heir presumptive to the Brazilian imperial throne. Even after the proclamation of the Republic in 1889, the title was kept in use by the Brazilian Imperial Family.

Overview
According to article 105 of the Brazilian Constitution of 1824, the title Prince Imperial should be used to designate the first in line to the imperial throne of Brazil. The Constitution also specifies that the eldest son of the Prince Imperial should be designated Prince of Grão-Pará, indicating the second in line of succession.

The last Emperor of Brazil, Pedro II, died in 1891, two years after the abolition of the Brazilian monarchy. His daughter, Isabel, Princess Imperial of Brazil, was the last holder of the title during the existence of the Empire. Since then, the title has been used by the heir to the head of the Brazilian Imperial House.

All the Brazilian princes (the Prince Imperial, the Prince of Grão-Pará and the other princes) were guaranteed a seat in the Senate after they reached the age of 25. However, for various reasons, including premature death and marriage with foreign dynasts, only Isabel actually sat in the Senate, becoming the first Brazilian woman to be a senator.

Finally, according to the Constitution and some later rules created by the Brazilian Imperial House, the princes in the line of succession must marry with members of other dynastic houses in order to keep the égalite de naissance to maintain their imperial titles. A princess who marries the head of another dynastic house would not transmit her Brazilian titles to their offspring, and the princes could not assume a foreign throne and keep their Brazilian titles. These restrictions are aligned to Portuguese and French royal traditions, although the Brazilian rules of succession are not directed by Salic law.

List of Princes Imperial

Claimants
Isabel, the last Princess Imperial, never ascended the throne because it was overthrown by coup d'état in 1889. After the 1891 death of her father, the last Brazilian emperor de facto, she became the Head of the Imperial House of Brazil, and gave the title of Prince Imperial to her eldest son, Prince Pedro de Alcântara of Orléans-Braganza. The title was not recognized by the Brazilian government, which had adopted a republican constitution.

Pedro de Alcântara died in 1940, the last member of the Brazilian Imperial House who had lived at the time of the Empire. His son, Prince Pedro Gastão, challenged Pedro Henrique's right to the succession in 1946, on the basis that his father's renunciation had no legal force. As a result, the Brazilian imperial family was split between a branch living at Petrópolis, led by Pedro Gastão and descended from Pedro de Alcântara, and another at Vassouras, led by Pedro Henrique and descended from Luiz.

Claimants descended from Prince Luís

Claimants descended from Prince Pedro de Alcântara

See also
Prince of Brazil, the title granted on to the heir to the throne of Portugal
Prince of Brazil (Brazil), the title granted on to non-heir (with some exceptions) members of the Brazilian Imperial Family

References

Titles of nobility in the Americas
Heirs to the throne